Die Welt ("The World") is a German national daily newspaper, published as a broadsheet by Axel Springer SE.
Die Welt is the flagship  newspaper  of the Axel Springer publishing group.  Its leading competitors are the Frankfurter Allgemeine Zeitung, the Süddeutsche Zeitung and the Frankfurter Rundschau.
The modern paper takes a self-described "liberal cosmopolitan" position in editing, but it is generally considered to be conservative.

As of 2016, the average circulation of Die Welt is about 180,000. The paper can be obtained in more than 130 countries. Daily regional editions appear in Berlin and Hamburg. A daily regional supplement also appears in Bremen. The main editorial office is in Berlin, in conjunction with the Berliner Morgenpost.

Die Welt was a founding member of the European Dailies Alliance, and has a longstanding co-operation with comparable daily newspapers from other countries, including The Daily Telegraph (UK), Le Figaro (France), and ABC (Spain).

From 2004 to 2019, the newspaper also published a compact edition entitled Welt Kompakt, a 32-page cut-down version of the main broadsheet targeted to a younger public. The paper does not appear on Sundays, but the linked publication Welt am Sonntag takes its place.

History 

Die Welt was founded in Hamburg in 1946 by the British occupying forces, aiming to provide a "quality newspaper" modelled on The Times. It originally carried news and British-viewpoint editorial content, but from 1947 it adopted a policy of providing two leading articles on major questions, one British and one German. The newspaper was bought by Axel Springer in 1953.

The 1993 circulation of the paper was 209,677 copies. At its peak in the occupation period, it had a circulation of around a million.

In 2002 the paper experimented with a Bavarian edition.

In November 2010, a redesign for the newspaper was launched, featuring a new logo with a dark blue globe, a reduced number of columns from seven to six, and typography based on the Freight typeface designed by Joshua Darden. Welt Kompakt was also redesigned to use that typeface. In 2009, the Sunday edition Welt am Sonntag was recognized as one of the "World's Best-Designed Newspapers" by the Society for News Design, along with four other newspapers.

On 2 May 2014, the Swiss German business magazine BILANZ began to be published as a monthly supplement of Die Welt.

On 18 January 2018 the German TV channel N24 changed its name to Welt.

Bans
The paper was banned in Egypt in February 2008 due to the publication of cartoons depicting the Islamic prophet Muhammad.

Welt-Literaturpreis
Since 1999, the Die Welt book supplement Die Literarische Welt ("The Literary World") has presented an annual  literature prize available to international authors. The award is in honor of Willy Haas who founded Die Literarische Welt in 1925.

Recipients

 1999 Bernhard Schlink
 2000 Imre Kertész
 2001 Pat Barker
 2002 Leon de Winter
 2003 Jeffrey Eugenides
 2004 Amos Oz
 2005 Yasmina Reza
 2006 Rüdiger Safranski
 2007 Daniel Kehlmann
 2008 Hans Keilson
 2009 Philip Roth
 2010 Claude Lanzmann
 2011 
 2012 Zeruya Shalev
 2013 Jonathan Franzen
2014 Murakami Haruki
2015 Karl Ove Knausgård
2016 Zadie Smith
2018 Virginie Despentes
2019 Salman Rushdie

Editors

 Rudolf Küstermeier (1946–1953)
 Bernhard Menne (1950)
 Paul Bourdin (1950)
 Hans Scherer, Adalbert Worliczek, Adolf Helbig (1950–1952)
 Albert Komma (1952–1953)
 Hans Zehrer (1946 / 1953–1966)
 Herbert Kremp (1969–1985)
 Manfred Schell (1985–1992)
 Peter Gillies (1985–1988)/(1992–1995)  
 Claus Jacobi (1993–1995)
 Thomas Löffelholz (1995–1998)
 Mathias Döpfner (1998–2000)
 Wolfram Weimer (2000–2002)
 Jan-Eric Peters (2002 – 31 December 2006)
 Thomas Schmid (1 January 2007 – 2010)
 Jan-Eric Peters (since 2010)

See also
 William Denholm Barnetson
 Media of Germany

References

Further reading
 Merrill, John C., and Harold A. Fisher. The world's great dailies: profiles of fifty newspapers (1980) pp. 353–60

External links
 

 
1946 establishments in Germany
Axel Springer SE
Centre-right newspapers
Conservative media in Germany
Daily newspapers published in Germany
German-language newspapers
German news websites
Liberal conservatism
Newspapers published in Hamburg
Newspapers published in Berlin
Publications established in 1946